Laburnum is a genus of tree in the family Fabaceae.

Laburnum may also refer to:

Places 
 Laburnum, Victoria, an area of Melbourne, Australia 
 Laburnum railway station
 Laburnum Avenue, in Richmond, Virginia, United States

Plants 
 Broom laburnum (+ Laburnocytisus 'Adamii'), a graft-chimaera
 Dalmatian laburnum (Petteria ramentacea)
 Indian laburnum (Cassia fistula)

Ships 
 HMMS Laburnum, a minelayer of the Royal Malaysian Navy
 , a sloop of the Royal Navy
 , a steamer of the United States Navy